There are more than 50 current and former places of worship in the borough of Woking, one of 11 local government districts in the English county of Surrey. The mostly urban area, centred on the Victorian railway town of Woking, is ethnically and demographically diverse.  As well as churches and chapels representing England's main Christian denominations, Woking is home to Britain's oldest purpose built mosque, a Buddhist temple and an Eastern Orthodox church (part of a monastery and shrine to Edward the Martyr, who is buried there).  Anglican parish churches in surrounding villages such as Pyrford, Old Woking and Byfleet are among the oldest buildings in the borough.

Eleven places of worship in the borough have listed status.  A building is defined as "listed" when it is placed on a statutory register of buildings of "special architectural or historic interest" in accordance with the Planning (Listed Buildings and Conservation Areas) Act 1990.  The Department for Culture, Media and Sport, a Government department, is responsible for this; Historic England (formerly English Heritage), a non-departmental public body, acts as an agency of the department to administer the process and advise the department on relevant issues.  There are three grades of listing status. Grade I, the highest, is defined as being of "exceptional interest"; Grade II* is used for "particularly important buildings of more than special interest"; and Grade II, the lowest, is used for buildings of "special interest".  As of February 2001, there were four Grade I-listed buildings, eight with Grade II* status and 50 Grade II-listed buildings in Woking borough.  The Shah Jahan Mosque was upgraded from Grade II* to Grade I status in March 2018.

Overview of the borough and its places of worship

The population rose by more than 10% between 2001 and 2011: more than 3,100 houses were built across the borough, which nevertheless retains much green space (more than 60% of the land area is covered by Green belt legislation). The town of Woking is the main population centre: its population was nearly 63,000 at the time of the United Kingdom Census 2001. The smaller towns of Knaphill (10,062), Byfleet (6,995) and West Byfleet (5,054), and the villages of Brookwood and Mayford, surround Woking town.

Woking "was a market town in the 17th century, although a little-known one". The surrounding area consisted of heathland with very poor soil—mostly of the acidic Bagshot Formation but with some alluvium and gravel associated with the Wey Valley. A few ancient trackways, all surviving as important roads, crossed the heath: the most significant was the Guildford–Chertsey road, which connected with routes from [Old] Woking to Byfleet, to Chertsey, to Knaphill and to Horsell; Horsell to Westfield and to Chobham; and  Knaphill to Pyrford. The modern town and borough grew around these roads and villages, but the area was remote and thinly populated during the medieval period. From that era survives St Peter's Church in Old Woking and the parish churches of the nearby villages of Horsell, Byfleet and Pyrford, all now subsumed by the growing town. The Basingstoke Canal was dug across Woking Common in 1794, and the South West Main Line, one of southern England's most important railway lines, was built parallel to it in 1838. The opening of Woking railway station, and the construction of an important branch line to Guildford and Portsmouth from 1845, put in place the foundations for the modern town to grow. By the time the railway opened, the four rural medieval churches were no longer adequate for the developing town. Built next to the canal in 1842, St John the Baptist's Church was the first of many Anglican places of worship to be built in modern Woking. The church founded five others around the borough as the population grew: Knaphill (1885 in a tin tabernacle; permanent church opened in 1907), Christ Church in the town centre (1889), Mayford (1905 as a mission hall; new church opened in 1992) Brookwood (1909), and Goldsworth Park (1988). Christ Church founded its own daughter church, St Paul's, in 1895; and the Woodham and Mount Hermon areas gained Anglican churches in 1893 and 1907 respectively. Temporary tin tabernacles served West Byfleet and Sutton Green until permanent churches were built in 1910 and 1921 respectively, and postwar churches were founded at Pyrford (complementing the ancient parish church to the south) and Sheerwater.

Roman Catholic worship takes place at the large modern St Dunstan's Church, opened in 2008, and at smaller churches in Knaphill, West Byfleet and Sutton Park.  The present St Dunstan's is the third church to bear that dedication: others were in Percy Street in the town centre (a tin tabernacle erected in 1899) and White Rose Lane south of the railway. The latter was built in 1924–27 to the design of J. Goldie and G.R. Gilbertson Topham.  A large site formerly occupied by a Catholic school became available in 2006, and the Diocese of Arundel and Brighton decided to consolidate services at a single modern building.  It raised money by closing and selling the old St Dunstan's Church and a small postwar church in the Kingfield suburb, which was demolished for housing after planning permission was granted in 2005.  West Byfleet is served by one Catholic church (dedicated to Our Lady Help of Christians), but its parish had three for a time: St John the Evangelist's Church on the Sheerwater estate opened in 1961 but closed 34 years later, and St Thomas More's Church served Byfleet village from 1973 until 2006.  On the southern edge of the borough near Guildford is the Sutton Place mansion and country estate which has its own Catholic church.  St Edward the Confessor's Church dates from 1876 and is part of Guildford Catholic parish.

The United Kingdom Census 1851 included questions about religious worship and was used to measure church attendance and the strength of Nonconformist groups.  It revealed that Nonconformism in the Woking area was well above the average for Surrey, in particular at Horsell where the proportion of residents attending non-Anglican services was among the highest in the county.  Church attendance of any type was lower overall, though: the remoteness of Woking at the time encouraged small groups and breakaway sects.  As late as 1882, the pastor of the isolated Baptist mission chapel at Anthonys bemoaned the lack of religious knowledge and general education among residents of that part of Horsell Common.

The first local Nonconformist chapel stood next to the present New Life Baptist Church in Old Woking, but the two are not directly related.  Independent Baptists led by the Hoad family from a nearby farm started meeting in 1770 and built a place of worship in 1782.  William Huntington was associated with the cause for a time during his period of ministering in Surrey.  Worshippers were attracted from many local villages, and informal meetings took place in Knaphill and Horsell by the early 19th century.  A chapel (no longer extant) was built in the latter in 1848.  People who followed the divergent Strict and Particular Baptist cause were catered for by the Horsell Common Chapel, built in front of two houses facing the common in 1816, by a chapel at Mayford (founded by 1824 and in use until the 20th century), and by Providence Chapel at Knaphill (founded in the 1860s and still in use).  Meanwhile, the first General Baptist place of worship in Woking town centre dated from 1879 (as a house church; permanent church from 1884) as an outreach from Addlestone.  Town-centre redevelopment caused the congregation to move to a new building in 1977, but this now identifies as a Newfrontiers Evangelical church.  Geographically, New Life Baptist Church brought Woking's Baptist history full circle when it was founded as Kingfield Baptist Church in 1929.  The old Independent chapel no longer survives but still stood in the mid-20th century, being used as a garage.

None of the borough's original Methodist places of worship survive, from either the Primitive or the Wesleyan branches of that denomination.  The first Nonconformist chapel in "new" Woking was a Primitive Methodist chapel on College Road, built in 1863 but no longer extant.  Another in Brookwood was used by Jehovah's Witnesses for many years after it closed but has now been demolished.  Originally registered for marriages in March 1916, it survived in Methodist use until November 1976.  The first meeting place for Wesleyan Methodist worship was a Wesleyan school on Chapel Street, used until a purpose-built chapel was erected next to it in 1884.  It was extended in 1893 but was superseded 11 years later by a tall, landmark chapel diagonally opposite, with a corner tower and spire.  Just over 60 years later the congregation moved again: Trinity Methodist Church opened on 12 June 1965 and the 1904 church was sold as part of the town centre redevelopment scheme—but burnt down before anything could be done.  The original 1893 chapel was demolished in the 1970s after the town's new library opened.  Knaphill's original Wesleyan chapel (1867) had to be replaced in 1935 by the present building because of concerns over its structural integrity.  A short-lived Wesleyan chapel in the St John's area of Woking was in existence by the late 1890s but soon closed and was used as a car garage before being demolished and replaced by a larger garage and showroom.  It stood at the junction of St John's Hill Road and St John's Road next to the Basingstoke Canal.  The Methodist Statistical Returns published in 1947 recorded the existence of the Brookwood, Byfleet, Knaphill and central Woking chapels and another on Walton Road in Woking, a 150-capacity building originally provided for Primitive Methodists.

Woking town centre supported two United Reformed Church congregations for a few decades after the denomination was formed by the merger of the Congregational Church and the English Presbyterian Church in 1972. Only one survives, though: it occupies the building which originally opened in 1952 as St Andrew's Presbyterian Church on White Rose Lane.  The town's original Congregational chapel, Mount Hermon Congregational Church, opened in 1899 and was extended in the 1950s and 1960s.  It later became York Road United Reformed Church but closed in January 2005,  was deregistered accordingly in April 2005 and has been demolished (planning permission for this was granted in November 2007).  There was also a small church in West Byfleet.

There are no surviving Plymouth Brethren meeting rooms in the borough, but Brethren groups have a long history locally: the Victoria County History recorded "a meeting-place" in 1911.  The former Strict Baptist chapel at Horsell Common was bought by a member of the Brethren in 1963 and was used by them until its demolition in the 1980s.  Also in Horsell, the Meadway Room on Meadway Drive was built in 1957 and was used for worship until 2010, when the reduced congregation moved to a large new Gospel Hall at Artington near Guildford.   Planning permission for its demolition was granted in 2011.  A small meeting room registered on Goldsworth Road in central Woking in the 1980s has been acquired by a Muslim community group.  There was also a meeting room on Station Road in West Byfleet.

Muslims, Buddhists and members of the Eastern Orthodox Church also have their own places of worship in the borough.  Shah Jahan Mosque in the Maybury area was "the centre of Islam in this country for several years" after it opened in 1889; it was also the first mosque of the modern era in Western Europe and the first purpose-built mosque in Britain.  It was home to the Woking Muslim Mission, which published the Islamic Review for many years.  Gottlieb Wilhelm Leitner founded and built it, but after his death in 1899 it remained closed until 1912.  Thai Buddhist adherents of the Dhammakaya Movement UK have established a temple in the former chapel of the Surrey County Asylum (latterly known as Brookwood Hospital), while a congregation of Eastern Orthodox Christians have since 1982 worshipped at one of the former Anglican cemetery chapels in Brookwood Cemetery.

Religious affiliation
According to the United Kingdom Census 2011, 99,198 people lived in the borough of Woking.  Of these, 58.8% identified themselves as Christian, 7.4% were Muslim, 2% were Hindu, 0.7% were Buddhist, 0.2% were Jewish, 0.2% were Sikh, 0.3% followed another religion, 23.1% claimed no religious affiliation and 7.3% did not state their religion.  The proportion of Christians was lower than the 59.8% recorded in England as a whole; the proportion of people with no religious affiliation was significantly lower (the national figure was 27.7%); and Sikhism and other religions also had a lower proportion of adherents than England as a whole.  The proportions of Woking residents identifying as Jewish or not stating their religion were broadly in line with the national figures.  Buddhism and Hinduism were followed by a greater proportion of people than in England as a whole—the respective national figures were 0.5% and 1.1%—but the most significant difference from the national picture was the much higher percentage of residents identifying as Muslim.  With more than 7,300 adherents of Islam, Woking borough has a percentage of 7.4% against the national figure of 2.3%.

Administration

Anglican churches
The 18 Anglican churches in the borough are administered by the Deanery of Woking.  This is part of the Diocese of Guildford, whose seat is Guildford Cathedral.  Also part of the deanery are the churches at Pirbright, Ripley, Send and Wisley, all of which are in the neighbouring Borough of Guildford.  The official names of the parishes within Woking borough, some of which cover more than one church, are Byfleet; Goldsworth Park; Horsell; Knaphill with Brookwood; West Byfleet; Wisley with Pyrford (covering the two churches in Pyrford); Woking Christ Church; Woking St John; Woking St Mary of Bethany; Woking St Paul; Woking St Peter; and Woodham.

Roman Catholic churches
Woking borough has four Roman Catholic churches—St Edward the Confessor's Church at Sutton Place, St Dunstan's Church southeast of Woking town centre, St Hugh of Lincoln's at Knaphill and Our Lady Help of Christians at West Byfleet.  St Edward the Confessor's is part of Guildford Deanery, and the other three are administered by Woking Deanery.  These are two of 13 deaneries in the Roman Catholic Diocese of Arundel and Brighton, whose cathedral is at Arundel in West Sussex.

Other denominations
Knaphill Baptist Church and the New Life Baptist Church at Old Woking are part of the Guildford Network of the South Eastern Baptist Association.  Providence Chapel in Knaphill maintains links with GraceNet UK, an association of Reformed Evangelical Christian churches and organisations.  The seven-church Woking and Walton-on-Thames Methodist Circuit administers the Methodist churches at Byfleet and Knaphill, Trinity Methodist Church in Woking town centre and the shared Anglican/Methodist church of St Michael's on the Sheerwater estate.  Woking United Reformed Church is part of the Wessex Synod, one of that denomination's 13 synods in the United Kingdom.  Horsell Evangelical Church is a member of two Evangelical groups: the Fellowship of Independent Evangelical Churches (FIEC), a pastoral and administrative network of about 500 churches with an evangelical outlook, and Affinity (formerly the British Evangelical Council), a network of conservative Evangelical congregations throughout Great Britain.  Providence Chapel at Knaphill is also a member of Affinity.

Listed status

Current places of worship

Former places of worship

Notes

References

Bibliography

 (Available online in 14 parts; Guide to abbreviations on page 6)

Woking (borough)
Woking
Woking (borough)
Churches
Woking, churches